The 2019 Hi-Tec Oils Bathurst 6 Hour was an endurance race for Group 3E Series Production Cars. The event, which was staged at the Mount Panorama Circuit, near Bathurst, in New South Wales, Australia, on 21 April 2019, was the fourth running of the Bathurst 6 Hour. The race was won by Beric Lynton and Tim Leahey, driving a BMW M3 F80 Competition. The race saw a new distance record established for the event, with 131 laps (813.903 km) completed.

Class structure 
Cars competed in the following classes:
 Class A1: Extreme Performance (Forced Induction)
 Class A2: Extreme Performance (Naturally Aspirated)
 Class B: High Performance
 Class C: Performance
 Class D: Production
 Class E: Compact

Results 

 Class winners are shown in bold text.
 Race time of winning car: 6:01:13.6680
 Pole position: 2:24.8000, Tim Leahey
 Fastest race lap: 2:27.9680, Tim Leahey

References 

Motorsport in Bathurst, New South Wales
Hi-Tec Oils Bathurst 6 Hour